The Pro Football Hall of Fame Game is an annual National Football League (NFL) exhibition game in Canton, Ohio, held the weekend of the Pro Football Hall of Fame's induction ceremonies. The game is played at Tom Benson Hall of Fame Stadium, part of Hall of Fame Village and located adjacent to the Hall of Fame building.

Team selection

The two teams that play in the Pro Football Hall of Fame Game are typically selected by the league in advance of the remainder of the preseason schedule. The participants are usually announced around the time that the new Hall of Fame members are announced, which coincides with Super Bowl week. Often, if a particularly notable player will be entering the Hall of Fame that year, a team they were strongly associated with may be selected to play in the game to help maximize attendance and publicity of the game itself.

In , as recognition of the 50th anniversary of the American Football League, the game paired two AFC teams who were part of the "original eight" franchises of the AFL (1960), the Tennessee Titans (dressed as their previous incarnation, the Houston Oilers) and the Buffalo Bills, whose owner, Ralph Wilson, was inducted into the Hall that year. From 2011 onward, each team selected to play in the game has had at least one prominent alumnus being inducted into the Hall that year.

Since the Hall of Fame Game and the Hall of Fame induction ceremony are scheduled for the weekend before the normal NFL preseason season starts, both teams end up playing an additional exhibition game compared to the remaining teams in the league (formerly four, three as of 2021).

The last four expansion teams added to the league all played in the Hall of Fame Game as their first game.

The Baltimore Ravens, officially established in 1996 as a result of the Browns' relocation, did not play in the Hall of Fame Game until 2018. With the Ravens' participation, all 32 current NFL teams have at least one appearance.

Scheduling
Prior to the AFL–NFL merger, the Hall of Fame Game was played in August or September, in some cases at the end of the preseason. In 1970, it was moved to the beginning of the preseason. Since 2001, when the league permanently moved the start of the season to the weekend after Labor Day, the game has always been played in early August. In 2002, the Hall of Fame enshrinement ceremony was moved from the steps of the museum to the football stadium. This created a tight schedule between the ceremony and the game.

The  game was originally scheduled between the Rams and the Bears, but the game was canceled due to an ongoing labor dispute that had disrupted nearly all league activity during the 2011 offseason. The two clubs had set a deadline of July 22 to ratify a resolution in enough time to prepare for the game. The league and players did not ratify the agreement until July 25, forcing cancellation of the game.

The  edition, which was scheduled to be played between the Packers and the Colts, was canceled at the last minute due to unsafe playing conditions. Mike Silver of NFL.com reported that on the morning of game day, it was discovered the logos at midfield and the end zones had been painted using paint which was not intended for use on the newly-installed synthetic FieldTurf. Subsequently, the paint had not fully dried, and officials heated the field to speed up the drying process, causing its rubber infill to melt; the affected areas were described as being slick and "like cement," making it impossible to get decent footing. Stadium officials attempted to address this by applying paint thinner to the turf, but a Packers employee noticed a label warning that this substance could result in burns when exposed to skin, and alerted them to the discovery. In deciding to cancel the game, the league and the Players Association cited safety concerns. 

Both teams were told at 6:40 p.m. EDT, eighty minutes before kickoff, that the game was going to be canceled. However, fans in the stadium only learned of the pending cancellation via social media, and no official announcement was made until just before the scheduled 8 p.m. kickoff, which was greeted by boos and jeering.

This change has been maintained since. Holding the game prior to the ceremony allows for safer field conditions. Immediately following the game, the stage and seating area for the Hall of Fame ceremony are erected in the stadium.

The game in —which was scheduled to be played between the Cowboys and the Steelers—as well as all other preseason games, was canceled due to the COVID-19 pandemic. The matchup was held over for the 2021 game.

Television and radio
Unlike the majority of NFL preseason games, which air on local television stations, the Hall of Fame Game airs nationwide. It had previously been held typically on Saturday afternoons, except from 1963 to 1965 on Sunday afternoons, televised as part of ABC's Wide World of Sports package (still using the MNF crew). In 1998, the game was put in the MNF package, and played on a Saturday night, which served as a test run for the move to Monday night. 

Since , the game has largely aired on NBC as part of the Sunday Night Football package (which replaced MNF as the NFL's flagship primetime broadcast that season), except in 2007 (due to NBC planning to air the China Bowl preseason game in Beijing, which was postponed and ultimately cancelled), and in all Summer Olympics years (2008, 2012, 2016, 2021, 2024, 2028 and 2032) due to NBC's coverage of the Games. In these years, the game has been sold to one of the NFL's other media partners, such as NFL Network (under Thursday Night Football), ESPN (under the current iteration of Monday Night Football), and most recently Fox.

Game history

Notes

Appearances 

 Most appearances
 7 – Dallas Cowboys (1968, 1979, 1999, 2010, 2013, 2017, 2021)
 7 – Pittsburgh Steelers (1963, 1964, 1983, 1998, 2007, 2015, and 2021)

 Fewest appearances
 1 – Baltimore Ravens (2018)
 1 – Carolina Panthers (1995)
 1 – Houston Texans (2002)

 Most wins 
 5 – Washington Redskins/Commanders (1965, 1975, 1989, 2004, 2008)

 Longest active streak without Hall of Fame Game appearance
 31 seasons – Detroit Lions (last appearance in 1991)
 30 seasons – New York Jets (1992)
 28 seasons – San Diego/Los Angeles Chargers (1994)
 27 seasons – Carolina Panthers (1995)

References

External links
 Pro Football Hall of Fame American Football League Legacy Game
 All-time Pro Football Hall of Fame Game Results

1962 establishments in Ohio
American football in Ohio
Annual sporting events in the United States
National Football League competitions
National Football League exhibition season
Pro Football Hall of Fame
Recurring sporting events established in 1962
Sports in Canton, Ohio
NFL on NBC 
American Broadcasting Company original programming
ABC Sports
ESPN original programming
NBC original programming